was one of 18   escort destroyers built for the Imperial Japanese Navy (IJN) during World War II. Completed in November 1944, the ship was badly damaged when she struck a naval mine in June 1945. She was not repaired before the end of the war and was scrapped in 1948.

Design and description
Designed for ease of production, the Matsu class was smaller, slower, and more lightly armed than previous destroyers, as the IJN intended them for second-line duties like escorting convoys, releasing the larger ships for missions with the fleet. Their crew numbered 210 officers and enlisted men. The ships had two Kampon geared steam turbines, each driving one propeller shaft, using steam provided by two Kampon water-tube boilers.

The main armament of the Matsu-class ships consisted of three  Type 89 dual-purpose guns in one twin-gun mount aft and one single mount forward of the superstructure. The single mount was partially protected against spray by a gun shield. The accuracy of the Type 89 guns was severely reduced against aircraft because no high-angle gunnery director was fitted. The ships carried a total of twenty-five  Type 96 anti-aircraft guns in 4 triple and 13 single mounts. The Matsus were equipped with Type 13 early-warning and Type 22 surface-search radars. The ships were also armed with a single rotating quadruple mount amidships for  torpedoes. They could deliver their 36 depth charges via two stern rails and two throwers.

Construction and career
Authorized in the late 1942 by the Modified 5th Naval Armaments Supplement Program, Nara was laid down by Fujinagata Shipyards on 10 June 1944 in its Osaka facility and launched on 12 October. Upon her completion on 26 November, the ship was assigned to Destroyer Squadron 11 of the Combined Fleet for training. The ship was assigned to the squadron's Destroyer Division 53 on 15 March. The squadron was briefly attached to the Second Fleet on 1–20 April before rejoining the Combined Fleet. She was badly damaged when she struck a mine near the Shimonoseki Strait on 30 June. The division was disbanded on 15 July; Nara was disarmed and towed to Moji. The ship was turned over to Allied forces there at the time of the surrender of Japan on 2 September and was stricken from the navy list on 30 November. Unrepaired, she was broken up at Shimonoseki in July 1948.

Notes

Bibliography

 

 
 

Matsu-class destroyers
Ships built by Fujinagata Shipyards
World War II destroyers of Japan
1944 ships